The Resurrection of Zachary Wheeler is a 1971 science fiction film directed by Bob Wynn and starring Leslie Nielsen, Bradford Dillman and Angie Dickinson. This was one of the earliest films to depict medical exploitation of cloning, even though the term was not used. It was shot on videotape and transferred to film for theatrical and TV release. Gold Key Entertainment commissioned this film at the same time as it commissioned the film The Day of the Wolves, and tried to persuade Ferde Grofe to film that on video because of the cost savings, but he declined.

Plot
Reporter Harry Walsh (Nielsen) witnesses an auto accident in which two people are killed. Recognizing the survivor as Senator Clayton Zachary Wheeler, (Dillman) he rides with him in the ambulance.

After he reports Wheeler's accident from the hospital, the staff tells him there is no such person admitted. Walsh's editor orders him to retract his story, which he refuses to do, at the cost of his job. Some detective work leads him to Alamogordo, New Mexico.

Meanwhile, Wheeler wakes up in a secret hospital run by Dr. Redding (Daly) and Dr. Layle Johnson (Dickinson). He finds out he is the recipient of an incredible transplant, utilizing organs harvested from "somas". These somas are bodies artificially grown from his own DNA.

Walsh has to elude two less-than-brilliant agents on his way to Alamogordo, finally escaping them, traveling with some migrant workers. Wheeler learns that the "fee" for his surgery is to do whatever he can do as Senator, for the Committee—a form of medical blackmail. Fielding (Wilke), the Committee chairman, refers to it as "a new type of money." Wheeler refuses to cooperate and threatens to turn the whole operation in. Fielding warns him he will never win a presidential nomination if news of his heart transplant gets out.

In Alamogordo, Walsh deduces that Wheeler's plane must have gone to Los Alamos, site of the old Manhattan Project. With the help of a newspaper buddy, he lands at the base and discovers an extra soma of Wheeler. Thinking it to be the senator, he breaks it out and commandeers Dr. Johnson's car.

The car wrecks when Walsh swerves to avoid hitting several somas wandering around. Johnson is injured, and Fielding tries to use the situation to change Wheeler's position, threatening not to save her. As Wheeler has grown fond of her, his resolve is weakening, but Redding assures him she is not badly injured.

Walsh and Wheeler finally meet, and agree to expose the Committee together, even as Fielding and Redding discuss a new "client" they have been hoping for.

Cast
 Leslie Nielsen	...	Harry Walsh
 Bradford Dillman	...	Sen. Clayton Zachary Wheeler/Soma
 James Daly	...	Dr. Redding
 Angie Dickinson	...	Dr. Layle Johnson
 Robert J. Wilke	...	Hugh Fielding
 Jack Carter	...	Dwight Chiles
 Don Haggerty	...	Jake
 Lew Brown	...	Collins
 Richard Schuyler	...	Bates
 Dick Simmons	...	Adams
 William Bryant	...	Craig Harmon
 Tris Coffin	...	Dr. Keating 
 Peter Mamakos	...	Premier Mabulla
 Ruben Moreno	...	General Muñoz
 Steve Cory	...	Carson
 Steve Conte   ... Radio Opr. #2

Production
Tom Rolf got the idea for the film reading about organ transplants in Esquire. At the time he was production coordinator on the TV series The Big Valley. Rolf told his friend Jay Simms, a writer on the series, about his idea. Together they wrote the film in about three weeks. They gave the script to Simms' agent, who liked it. Rolf felt that despite the low budget, the film was ahead of its time, and was pleased with it. Rolf was normally an editor and this film was his only writing credit.

The name used for the clones, soma, is Greek for "body". They share the name with the hallucinogenic drug used by the urbanites in Aldous Huxley's 1932 novel, Brave New World. The film is noted as possibly the earliest to depict surgical transplants using clones for parts.

According to Variety, this was the first American film to be shot on videotape and transferred to film for release. Actually, there had been others, such as T.A.M.I. Show, before it.

See also
 List of American films of 1971

References

External links

1971 films
American science fiction films
Films about organ transplantation
Films about cloning
1970s English-language films
1970s American films